Kahlil Dukes (born May 17, 1995) is an American basketball player for Best Balıkesir of the Turkish Basketball First League. He played college basketball for the University of Southern California (USC) and Niagara University and was named the 2018 Metro Atlantic Athletic Conference Co-Player of the Year.

College career
A  point guard and Hartford, Connecticut native, Dukes attended Capital Prep Magnet School and scored 2,238 points for his high school career. He was recruited to USC by coach Kevin O'Neill, but O'Neill was fired prior to Dukes arriving to campus. Dukes played sparingly for new coach Andy Enfield and ultimately decided to transfer to Niagara due to family and AAU connections with Chris Casey's coaching staff. Per NCAA transfer rules, Dukes sat out the 2015–16 season.

As a redshirt junior, Dukes immediately entered the starting lineup for the Purple Eagles. He averaged 15.5 points and 4.1 assists per game on the season. As a senior, Dukes raised his scoring average to 21 points per game and led the Purple Eagles to a 12–6 Metro Atlantic Athletic Conference (MAAC) record. At the close of the 2017–18 season, was named the MAAC co-Player of the Year with Canisuius' Jermaine Crumpton. The duo were also named honorable mention All-Americans by the Associated Press.

Professional career
Following the close of his college career, Dukes signed with BC Irkut of the Russian Basketball Super League 1.

In July 2019, Dukes signed for Hamburg Towers.

After his time in Germany, the guard left Hamburg Towers to sign with Legia Warszawa Koszywówka, signing the contract on December 16, 2019, getting assigned the #10 jersey. He averaged 17.1 points per game in 10 games. On July 31, 2020, Dukes signed with Samsunspor of the Turkish Basketball First League. He averaged 18.7 points, 4.2 assists, and 2.8 rebounds per game. On August 29, 2021, Dukes signed with BC Balkan Botevgrad of the Bulgarian National Basketball League. He averaged 11.2 points, 1.7 rebounds, and 4.8 assists per game. On February 15, 2022, Dukes signed with Best Balıkesir of the Turkish Basketball First League.

References

External links
Niagara Purple Eagles bio
USC Trojans bio
College stats @ sports-reference.com

1995 births
Living people
American expatriate basketball people in Bulgaria
American expatriate basketball people in Germany
American expatriate basketball people in Russia
American expatriate basketball people in Poland
American men's basketball players
Basketball players from Hartford, Connecticut
Hamburg Towers players
Legia Warsaw (basketball) players
Niagara Purple Eagles men's basketball players
Point guards
USC Trojans men's basketball players